Portland Township may refer to:

Canada 
 Portland Township, now part of South Frontenac, Ontario

United States 

 Portland Township, Ashley County, Arkansas, in Ashley County, Arkansas
 Portland Township, Whiteside County, Illinois
 Portland Township, Cerro Gordo County, Iowa
 Portland Township, Kossuth County, Iowa
 Portland Township, Plymouth County, Iowa
 Portland Township, Michigan
 Portland Township, Deuel County, South Dakota, in Deuel County, South Dakota

See also 
 Portland (disambiguation)

Township name disambiguation pages